Agonum affine is a species of ground beetle in the Platyninae subfamily. It was described by William Forsell Kirby in 1837 and is endemic to the United States.

References

Beetles described in 1837
affine
Endemic fauna of the United States
Beetles of North America